Pimelea lyallii, commonly known as the southern sand daphne, is a species of small shrub of the family Thymelaeaceae.

Description
Pimelea lyallii has a prostrate habit. Its stems grow up to 60 cm long, with leaves that are 5 to 7 mm long and 2 to 3 mm wide.  Its flowers are hairy and white, and grow in clusters.  The fruit it produces is also white.

Distribution and habitat
The species is endemic to New Zealand, and found only on the Foveaux Strait and Stewart Island / Rakiura coasts. The shrub grows in coastal sand dunes and is often found partially covered in sand.

Conservation status
Pimelea lyallii is classified as at risk under the New Zealand Threat Classification System (NZTCS) due to being naturally uncommon.

References

lyallii
Flora of New Zealand
Endemic flora of New Zealand